I, Lovett is a BBC television sitcom written by Norman Lovett and Ian Pattison.  Seven episodes were broadcast, a pilot in 1989 and a six-episode series in 1993.

Plot
The series stars Norman Lovett playing a version of himself who is an inventor living in a world of surrealism with his talking dog, voiced by Geoffrey Hughes; spider, voiced by Mary Riggans; and inanimate objects.

Production
In 1989 a one-off pilot episode was made for the anthology series Comic Asides, the BBC commissioned a full series which was broadcast four years later in 1993.  In total seven episodes were made each one was shown on BBC2, directed by Ron Bain and produced by Colin Gilbert.

Episode list

Pilot

Series 1

References

External links

1980s British sitcoms
1990s British sitcoms
1989 British television series debuts
1993 British television series endings
BBC television sitcoms
English-language television shows